A4A may refer to: 
 Adam4Adam, a gay dating service
 Airlines for America, an industry association in the United States
 Apps4Africa, an African innovation accelerator